Chicago Syndicate may refer to:

 Chicago Syndicate (film), 1955 US film
 Chicago Syndicate (video game), 1996 video game
 Chicago Outfit, an Italian-American crime syndicate based in Chicago, Illinois